In 2002, there were 25 This American Life episodes.

Act 1: Love Story – Ira Glass
Act 2: War Story – John Brasfield
Act 3: Special Effects Story – Kevin Murphy
Act 4: Buddy Picture – Jonathan Goldstein

Show description: Devoted entirely to Alix Spiegel's feature on the removal of homosexuality as a form of mental illness from the DSM-II during the 1973 meeting of the APA. Spiegel won the 2002 Livingston Award for National Reporting for this episode.
Act 1: Untitled – Alix Spiegel
Act 2: Untitled – Alix Spiegel

Act 1: It's Another Tequila Sunrise – John Hodgman
Act 2: Why Talk? – Starlee Kine
Act 3: Kidnapping as Plan B – Ira Glass
Act 4: A Fate Most of Us Fear – Jonathan Goldstein
Act 5: The Accursed Items – J. Robert Lennon

Act 1: Untitled – Wendy Dorr, Alex Blumberg and Ira Glass

Act 1: Get on the Mic – Ira Glass
Act 2: Black Hole Son
Act 3: Walkout – Veronica Chater

Act 1: Hang In There Kitty Cat, It's Almost Friday – Starlee Kine
Act 2: Sheetcakes in the Conference Room, Whiskey After Dark – David Rakoff
Act 3: When the Job That Takes You Off the Streets Is On The Streets – Julie Snyder
A story about the culture and politics of street vendors and panhandlers in New York City

Act 1: The chronicle of a family that unravelled – Debra Gwartney and Sandy Tolan
Act 2: Untitled – Brent Runyon

Act 1: Hawks and Rabbits – Shane DuBow
Act 2: Snitch

Act 1: How Britain Nearly Saved America – Jon Ronson
Act 2: One Crucible Leads to Another – Elia Kazan and Arthur Miller
Act 3: Beating the Erasers – Susan Drury

Act 1: Psychic Buddha, Qu'est-ce Que C'est – Davy Rothbart
Act 2: The Jackson Two – Ira Glass
Act 3: Mr. Fun – Jonathan Goldstein and Heather O'Neill

Act 1: It's Fun to Make Hell on Earth – George Ratliff
Act 2: Sixteen Candles Can Lead to a Lot of Fire – Ira Glass
Act 3: Devil in Angel's Clothing, or Is It the Other Way Around? – Sarah Koenig

Act 1: Occam's Razor – Cris Beam
Act 2: The Trajectory and Force of Bodies in Orbit – Jon Ronson
Act 3: Conservation of Energy and Matter – David Sedaris

Act 1: An Epidemic Created by Doctors – Alix Spiegel
Act 2: Not Stella Adler, Just Stellllaaah – Jod Kaftan

Act 1: Let Them Eat Cake, Wedding Cake – Ira Glass
Act 2: God Shed his Grace on Thee – Jack Hitt
Act 3: Have Paint, Will Travel – Alex Kotlowitz and Amy Dorn
Act 4: Handing People Their Dreams – Ali Davis
Act 5: What Daddy Wants – Curtis Sittenfeld

Act 1: Life Indoors – Nancy Updike
Act 2: Here and There in the Land of Israel – Ira Glass
Act 3: What's a Moderate? – Nancy Updike

Act 1: Act Five, Scene 1 – Jack Hitt
Act 2: Act Five, Scene 2 – Jack Hitt

Act 1: Cowboys and Indians, Part 1 – Susan Burton
Act 2: Cowboys and Indians, Part 2 – Susan Burton

Act 1: Life at Zero – Ira Glass
Act 2: Infinite Gent
Act 3: Contest-osterone
Act 4: Learning to Shut Up – Miriam Toews

Act 1: Pole Vault – Ira Glass
Act 2: This Blessed House – Jhumpa Lahiri
Act 3: The Lie that Binds – David Sedaris

Act 1: No Receipt, No Surrender – "Jen"
Act 2: The Stereo Type – Shane DuBow
Act 3: Suckers in the Promised Land – Adam Davidson
Act 4: Mother Sucker – Heather O'Neill

Centered on classified ads appearing on the same day in the Chicago Sun-Times and the Chicago Reader
Act 1: Lost and Found Ads – Todd Bachmann
Act 2: Help Wanted – Joe Richman
Act 3: Musicians Classifieds – Starlee Kine
Act 4: Personal Ads – Jonathan Goldstein
Act 5: For Sale – Jay Allison

Act 1: Show Me the Monet – Alex Blumberg and Davy Rothbart
Act 2: Stuck inside of Memphis
Act 3: What it Takes to Tromp Through the Desert – Wendy Dorr

Act 1: The Big Night – Jonathan Goldstein
Act 2: The Kids Stay in the Picture – Ira Glass
Act 3: A Half-Million Home Videos Can't be Wrong – Ira Glass
Act 4: The Cinema of Upward Mobility – Susan Burton
Act 5: Untitled – David Sedaris

Act 1: Action! Action! Action! – Starlee Kine talks about Trent Harris' Beaver Trilogy
Act 2: Marriage as Rerun, featuring John Hodgman and Robert Krulwich – Ira Glass
Act 3: Reruns at the back of the Bus – Sarah Vowell

Act 1: Senator's Proxy – Ira Glass
Act 2: When Firas Comes Marching Home Again – Adam Davidson
Act 3: Realism 101 – Ira Glass
Act 4: Who Cares?

External links
This American Lifes radio archive for 2002

2002
This American Life
This American Life